Demon Slayer: Kimetsu no Yaiba is a Japanese manga series written and illustrated by Koyoharu Gotouge. Gotouge launched the manga in 2016's 11th issue of Shueisha's shōnen manga magazine Weekly Shōnen Jump on February 15, 2016, and ran until May 18, 2020. A side-story for the manga was published in the first issue of Shonen Jump GIGA on July 20, 2016. It follows teenage Tanjiro Kamado, who strives to become a demon slayer after his family was slaughtered and his younger sister Nezuko turned into a demon.

Viz Media published the first three chapters of the series in its digital magazine Weekly Shonen Jump as part of the "Jump Start" program, but did not pick the series up for continued serialization. Viz announced their license to the series during their panel at San Diego Comic-Con on July 20, 2017. At their Anime NYC panel on November 15, 2019, Viz announced their plan to release volumes monthly starting in May 2020. A collection containing the entire series was released by Viz Media on November 9, 2021.


Volume list

Notes

References

External links
  
  at Shonenjump.com 
  at Viz.com

Lists of manga volumes and chapters
Demon Slayer: Kimetsu no Yaiba